Stefan Schmidt (born 19 May 1981) is a German politician. Born in Freystadt, Bavaria, he represents the Alliance 90/The Greens. Stefan Schmidt has served as a member of the Bundestag from the state of Bavaria since 2017.

Life 
After graduating from high school, Stefan Schmidt studied teaching at the University of Regensburg. He is a trained secondary school teacher with a focus on political education. From 2007 to 2013 he worked there as a research assistant. From 2009 he was also a research assistant to Thomas Gambke, member of the Bundestag; from 2013 he was also employed by Doris Wagner, member of the Bundestag. He became member of the bundestag after the 2017 German federal election. He is a member of the Tourism Committee and the Finance Committee. For his parliamentary group he is spokesman for municipal finances.

References

External links 

  
 Bundestag biography 

1981 births
Living people
Members of the Bundestag for Bavaria
Members of the Bundestag 2021–2025
Members of the Bundestag 2017–2021
Members of the Bundestag for Alliance 90/The Greens
People from Neumarkt (district)